Michael Manley (born October 19, 1961) is an American artist, most notable as a comic strip cartoonist and comic book inker and penciller. Manley currently draws two syndicated comic strips, Judge Parker and The Phantom. He is also known for co-creating the Marvel Comics character Darkhawk.

Personal life
Manley was born in Detroit, Michigan.

Manley's grandfather was a commercial artist, and Manley was therefore aware as a child that one could make a living at drawing. He says he always liked comics and cartooning, and recalls being impressed when The Wonderful World of Disney showed the animation artists working behind the scenes.

As a youth in Michigan, Manley visited a comic book store every day after school, and became a serious collector and reader. By the time he was a teenager, Manley had decided he wanted to be a comic book artist or animator or illustrator.

"Frank Frazetta seemed to be able to do everything, so he was my role model," Manley said. "How could you escape him, he so influenced the art world that you would still get influenced by him through other artists who were influenced by him even if somehow you never knew his art."

A commercial art class in high school in Ann Arbor enabled Manley to assemble a portfolio, which led to his start in commercial printing at age fifteen. He attended Washtenaw Community College, but found the art education he was receiving there to be unsatisfying. At age twenty-one, Manley began working for the Detroit Metro Times as art director. Two years after, he had his first comic book art assignment at DC Comics.

He cites other artists in addition to Frazetta as inspiration: Alex Raymond, Stan Drake, Leonard Starr, John Prentice, and Al Williamson. In his late twenties, Manley would have the opportunity to work for a brief but intensely formative time alongside Williamson, in that artist's Honesdale, Pennsylvania studio.

Manley lives in Upper Darby, Pennsylvania just outside Philadelphia.

Career

Comic book artist
Mike Manley has worked as an artist for major publishers such as Marvel Comics, DC Comics, and Dark Horse Comics. Manley, with writers Danny Fingeroth and Tom DeFalco, co-created in 1991 the Darkhawk series, which he drew for the first half of its run. He has also contributed to other comic book titles such as Batman, Quasar, Captain America, Marvel Universe, and The Power of Shazam!. His extensive bibliography in comic books includes a large number of short runs and fill-in issues on a wide variety of titles.

In his run on the Batman series, Manley was one of the artists of Batman #500 in which the character Azrael replaced Bruce Wayne as Batman. He drew the series during the "KnightsEnd" storyline and the Zero Hour: Crisis in Time crossover.

In 1995, Manley formed Action Planet Inc. as a home to publish his own comics and ideas, starting with the anthology Action Planet Comics, featuring his character Monsterman. In early 1996 he founded ActionPlanet.com, which has grown to include his award-winning on-line web comic, G.I.R.L. Patrol.

In 2007, while primarily working as an art teacher, Manley illustrated a new Secret Agent Corrigan story for the Swedish publisher Egmont Publishing (Manley's mentor Al Williamson had famously drawn the character's syndicated strip).

Book illustrator
Concurrently with some of his time at Marvel Comics, between 1985 and 1990, Manley illustrated children's books utilizing licensed characters. For Macmillan Publishing, he illustrated books in their Raggedy Ann and Andy series. For Golden Books and Western Publishing he worked on several children's fun and activity books, with Barbie, He-Man, Captain Power, Tiny Toons, Ghost Busters and the Muppets as some of the characters featured.

In 1989 Manley worked for West End Games on role-playing game books in the Star Wars line.

Animation artist

In 1996 Manley moved into the animation field, first working as a storyboard artist on Superman: The Animated Series for Kids' WB. The first of the seven episodes that included his work featured Lobo, and was titled "The Main Man, Part 2". Manley also worked on the storyboards team for three episodes of The New Batman Adventures between 1997 and 1998.

Throughout the 2000s, Manley created storyboards as a freelance artist on TV cartoons such as: Samurai Jack (on which series he also received two writing credits); Kim Possible; The Fairly OddParents; The Venture Brothers; Growing Up Creepie; and The Secret Saturdays. Other projects in this period included: Spy Groove for MTV; Spawn for HBO; ABC's One Saturday Morning; Clerks: The Animated Series, based on the Kevin Smith movie; and Justice League: The New Frontier.

Between 1998 and 2001, Manley was a background key designer for Superman: The Animated Series (nine episodes, following his time as a storyboard artist on that series), and background key designer then background designer on Batman Beyond (thirty-three episodes overall).

He is also credited as character designer on eight episodes of Batman: The Brave and the Bold between 2008 and 2009.

Art teacher
While working in both comics and animation, Manley created and edited Draw! Magazine, a twice Eisner-nominated "how-to" magazine published by TwoMorrows Publishing. The magazine features step-by-step demos and articles on artists working in comics, cartooning, and animation. Manley also co-produced a how-to DVD along with Danny Fingeroth, How to Create Comics from Script to Print, also distributed by TwoMorrows.

In 2000, Manley started a new career as an art teacher. He taught in the animation department at the Delaware College of Art and Design (DCAD) until 2009 and became a senior lecturer at the  University of the Arts in Philadelphia. Manley then enrolled at the Pennsylvania Academy of the Fine Arts, finishing his certificate in painting on his way toward completing his master's degree.

Comic strip artist
Manley was hired to draw the serial newspaper comic strip Judge Parker for four weeks beginning March 15, 2010, filling in for regular artist Eduardo Barreto during an illness. The syndicate essentially held a "two-man tryout" for Barreto's replacement, with Manley's audition following John Heebink's; Manley was offered the full-time job after he turned in his second week of art for the strip. Manley and Heebink had known each other since high school. Manley draws the strip for all seven days of the week.

In late March 2016, it was announced that Manley would succeed Paul Ryan, who had died unexpectedly, as artist on The Phantom daily strips (the Sundays would continue to be drawn by the incumbent, Terry Beatty). Manley's tenure began with the strip dated May 30, 2016. Manley noted that he and Paul Ryan are numbered among a small and notable group of artists who have professionally drawn the adventures of both Batman and The Phantom. The others have been Jim Aparo, Terry Beatty, Don Newton, Carmine Infantino (as a ghost for Sy Barry), Joe Giella (ghosting for Bob Kane) and Graham Nolan.

The choice of Manley to take on the Phantom received an endorsement from Comic Strip of the Day.com: "He's one of the few who has found a way to maintain some detail in an ever-shrinking print medium that has driven most artists to a simplified style that works better in shrinky-dink mode than when the comics are read on line, at least on a real computer with a real monitor."

Bibliography

Dark Horse Comics
 Aliens Vs. Predator: War #1 (1995)

DC Comics

 Adventures in the DC Universe Annual #1 (1997)  
 Adventures of Superman #519 (1995)  
 Aquaman: Sword of Atlantis #49 (2007)  
 Batman #500–506, 508–511, #0, Annual #19 (1993–1995) 
 Batman: Brotherhood of the Bat #1 (1995)  
 Batman: Legends of the Dark Knight Annual #3 (1993)  
 Batman: Shadow of the Bat #16 (1993)  
 Birds of Prey #66 (2004)  
 Cartoon Network Action Pack #29–30, 32, 34, 36, 39–40 (2008–2009)  
 Catwoman vol. 3 #14 (2003)  
 Catwoman Secret Files and Origins #1 (2002)  
 Convergence Justice League International #1–2 (2015)  
 Dexter's Laboratory #7, 12, 24, 33 (2000–2003)  
 Green Arrow vol. 2 #46 (1991)  
 Guardians of Metropolis #1–4 (1994–1995)  
 Hardware #4, 6–7 (1993)  
 Jaguar #7  (1992)  
 Power of Shazam #1–27, 37, Annual #1 (1995–1998)  
 Powerpuff Girls #7  (2000)  
 The Question Quarterly #4–5 (1991–1992)  
 Robotech Defenders #2 (1985)  
 Samurai Jack Special #1 (2002)
 Star Trek: The Next Generation #18 (1991)  
 Superboy vol. 3 #68 (1999)  
 Supergirl Plus #1 (1997) 
 Superman #660 (2007)   
 Superman vol. 2 #95 (1994)  
 Superman Adventures #9, 25, 28, 34, 41, Special #1 (1997–2000)  
 Young Heroes in Love #4 (1997)

First Comics
 Jon Sable, Freelance #44, 46–49 (1987)

Image Comics
 Action Planet Comics #3 (1997)  
 Deathmate Yellow #1 (1993)

Marvel Comics

 Alpha Flight #71, 73–82, 84–91, 93–96 (1989–1991) 
 Black Panther vol. 4 #9–10 (1999)  
 Captain America #447, Annual #10  (1991–1996)
 Clive Barker's Night Breed #7–8 (1991)  
 Daredevil #264 (1989) 
 Darkhawk #1–25, Annual #1 (1991–1993)
 Deathlok vol. 2 #1–7, 9–15, Annual #1 (1991–1992)  
 The Destroyer #2 (1989)  
 Friendly Neighborhood Spider-Man #9–10 (2006)  
 Ghost Rider vol. 3 #38 (1993)  
 Ghost Rider/Blaze: Spirits of Vengeance #14–15 (1993)  
 Marvel Double-Shot #3 (2003)  
 Marvel Holiday Special #4 (1994)  
 Marvel Universe #4–7 (1998)  
 Moon Knight: Divided We Fall #1 (1992) 
 New Mutants #73 (1989)
 Powerline #8 (1989)  
 Power Pack #50, 52 (1989)  
 The Punisher War Zone #7–11 (1992–1993)  
 Quasar #7–17 (1990) 
 A Shadowline Saga: Critical Mass #2, 4–5, 7 (1990) 
 Sleepwalker #8–10, 13–14, 17 (1992)  
 The Spectacular Spider-Man Annual #10 (1990)  
 Spider-Man #55 (1995)  
 Spider-Man Holiday Special '95 #1 (1996)  
 The Transformers #9 (1985)  
 Ultimate Civil War: Spider-Ham #1 (2007)  
 Weaveworld #1–3 (1991–1992)  
 Web of Spider-Man #66  (1990)  
 West Coast Avengers Annual #4  (1989)

Valiant Comics
 Destroyer #0 (1995)  
 Ninjak #18–21 (1995)  
 Solar, Man of the Atom #57–58 (1996)  
 Timewalker #0 (1996)  
 X-O Manowar #4 (1992)

References

External links

1961 births
American animators
American children's book illustrators
American comics artists
American educators
American storyboard artists
Background artists
Living people
Pennsylvania Academy of the Fine Arts alumni
Role-playing game artists